Road Rules: Islands is the fourth season of the MTV reality television series Road Rules. It took place exclusively on various island locations and in the United States.

Cast

Missions

Episodes

After filming

The Challenge

Challenge in bold indicates that the contestant was a finalist on the Challenge.

Notes

External links

Road Rules
1997 American television seasons